Shuichi Thomas Kurai (December 14, 1947—June 29, 2018) was a Japanese-born Soto Zen roshi and head abbot of Sozenji Buddhist Temple in Montebello, California. Raised in a Soto temple in Japan, he moved to California with his parents in 1952, where his father (Reverend Shuyu Kurai) served as priest at the Zenshuji Soto Mission in Little Tokyo. In addition to his role as a Zen teacher, Kurai also instructed others in how to play taiko. Kurai was a member of the American Zen Teachers Association.

Kurai died on June 29, 2018 at the age of 70 following a diagnosis of adult T-Cell leukemia.

Notes

References

Soto Zen Buddhists
Zen Buddhist abbots
Japanese Zen Buddhists
American Zen Buddhists
1947 births
2018 deaths
People from Montebello, California
People from Mie Prefecture
Japanese emigrants to the United States
Rōshi